Peralta is a municipality (municipio) of the Azua province in the Dominican Republic.

The village resides at between 5,000 and 7,000 feet in the mountains. It is about a 40 to 50 minutes trip up and down the mountain to the city of Azua de Compostela. The village is primarily focused on agriculture, livestock, and fruits. Electricity is available for all inhabitants in Peralta. However, it does go out from time to time. Blackouts can range from an hour to the whole day.

There are two rivers in the village, many of the villagers bathe in the river even though they have access to running water. There are a total of four major barrios: Los Jobos, El Higüero, El Mercado, Camboya.

References 

Populated places in Azua Province
Municipalities of the Dominican Republic
They do have access to running water (since mid70's.)